Neil Carroll (born 21 September 1988) is an English footballer with Caernarfon Town.

Carroll joined Chester City as a junior, progressing to a professional contract. He made his solitary Football League appearance for Chester in a 2–1 win at Macclesfield Town on 29 September 2007, starting the game in midfield. He was loaned to Leigh RMI under Steve Bleasdale in 2008 and was released by Chester at the end of the season.

He joined Caernarfon Town in July 2008.

External links

Premier League profile

References

Chester City F.C. players
Leigh Genesis F.C. players
English footballers
English Football League players
1988 births
Association football midfielders
Living people
Caernarfon Town F.C. players
Cymru Premier players
People from Cheltenham